Philip Adam Cave (born 12 May 1987) is a former English footballer who last played for  Bedlington Terriers as a left-sided defender.

Career
Cave started off as a trainee at Newcastle United but did not make a first team appearance before signing for Gateshead in August 2007. Playing a pivotal role in a strong Gateshead side who won promotion via the play-offs, Cave then went on to sign for Livingston after a successful trial.
After featuring mainly as a substitute for Livingston, Cave joined previous club Gateshead on loan until the end of the 2008–09 season. Cave rejoined Gateshead for the 2009–10 season. Cave was released by Gateshead at the end of the season. In July 2010 Conference North side Blyth Spartans announced the signing of Cave. After making 82 appearances in all competitions, scoring 3 goals, Cave left Blyth on 12 March 2012. Cave signed for Ashington on 25 May 2012.

References

External links
Phil Cave's Blyth Spartans A.F.C. profile

1987 births
Living people
Footballers from Newcastle upon Tyne
English footballers
Association football defenders
Newcastle United F.C. players
Gateshead F.C. players
Livingston F.C. players
Bedlington Terriers F.C. players
Blyth Spartans A.F.C. players
Ashington A.F.C. players
Scottish Football League players
National League (English football) players
Northern Premier League players
Northern Football League players